Mbuyisa Makhubu (born 1957 or 1958) is a South African anti-Apartheid activist who disappeared in 1979. He was seen carrying Hector Pieterson in a photograph taken by Sam Nzima after Pieterson was shot during the Soweto Uprising in 1976. Despite the photograph's endurance, little is known about Makhubu.

After the photograph was released, Makhubu was harassed by the security services, and was forced to flee South Africa. His mother, Nombulelo Makhubu, told the Truth and Reconciliation Commission that she received a letter from him from Nigeria in 1978, but that she had not heard from him since. She died in 2004, seemingly without knowledge of what had happened to her son. Mbuyisa was one of a number of South African activists given refuge in Nigeria immediately following the Soweto incident. He was one of three who were settled in a boarding high school in South-Western Nigeria - Federal Government College, during the 1976-1977 academic year. But all failed to settle, and had moved on within the year.

In 2013, claims emerged that a man, Victor Vinnetou, imprisoned in Canada for the previous eight years on immigration charges was Makhubu. Genetic tests were conducted to determine whether he was indeed Mbuyisa Makhubo. It was later reported that the DNA tests did not substantiate the man's claim to be Makhubu, to the disappointment of Makhubu's family, though the DNA test was reported to have been done on a family member without blood relations to both parents.

As of 2020, his whereabouts still remain unknown. The same year, a four-episode documentary titled Through The Cracks, which was released on 44th anniversary of the uprising on June 16, 2020, provided some previously untold details about Makhubu's life. It was also reported that a heritage plaque commemorating Makhubu would be installed on June 16, 2020 as well.

Further reading
 Davie, Lucille. "Hector Pieterson Gets His Memorial." City Of Johannesburg Official Website
 Davie, Lucille. "The Day Hector Pieterson Died." SA Web Directory

References

Possibly living people
Anti-apartheid activists
Year of birth uncertain
1950s births